Janelle may refer to:

 Janelle (given names)
 Janelle (surnames)
 20673 Janelle, asteroid

Fictional characters:
 Janelle, a.k.a. Janae Timmins
 Janelle Duco, in episode "From a Whisper to a Scream" of television series Grey's Anatomy

See also 
 The Real Janelle, music album
 Janell, a given name
 Janel (disambiguation)